Love, Love is an album by American jazz trombonist and composer Julian Priester Pepo Mtoto recorded in 1973 and released on the ECM label.

Reception
The Allmusic review by Scott Yanow awarded the album 3½ stars stating "The two lengthy improvisations are mostly on one-chord repetitive rhythmic vamps stated by the bass, featuring sound explorations and plenty of electronics. Only on the last half of the second medley does Priester himself emerge a bit from the electronic sounds. One is reminded of Bitches Brew, since that is an obvious influence, but also Hancock's group and Weather Report. The music develops slowly, but listeners with patience will enjoy the blending of the many different voices in this unusual musical stew". 

The Penguin Guide to Jazz Recordings describes it as “one of the best albums of its period, subtly contrived and richly executed by a fascinating ensemble.

Track listing
All compositions by Julian Priester Pepo Mtoto
 "Prologue/Love, Love" - 19:30 
 "Images/Eternal Worlds/Epilogue" - 18:24 
Recorded at Different Fur Music in San Francisco, California on June 28 and September 12, 1973

Personnel
Julian Priester Pepo Mtobo - trombone, horns, whistle, flute, percussion, synthesizer
Pat Gleeson - synthesizer
Hadley Caliman - flute, saxophone, clarinet
Mguanda David Johnson - flute, saxophone
Bill Connors - electric guitar
Bayete Umbra Zindiko - piano, clavinet
Ron McClure - electric bass (track 1)
Nyimbo Henry Franklin - electric bass (track 2)
Ndugu Leon Chancler - drums
Kamau Eric Gravatt - drums, congas

References

ECM Records albums
Julian Priester albums
1974 albums